Juan Carlos Martín Corral (born 20 January 1988), known as Juan Carlos, is a Spanish professional footballer who plays for Girona FC as a goalkeeper.

Club career
Born in Guadalajara, Castilla–La Mancha, Juan Carlos made his senior debut with CD Guadalajara in the 2004–05 season, in the Tercera División. He joined Rayo Vallecano on 26 July 2005, returning to youth football.

Juan Carlos was promoted to the reserves in summer 2007, and appeared regularly with the side in the fourth tier and Segunda División B. On 5 June 2011 he played his first match as a professional, starting in a 2–3 home loss against FC Barcelona B in the Segunda División.

On 4 July 2011, after being deemed surplus to requirements, Juan Carlos moved to Hércules CF also in division two. On 2 July 2013, he signed for Córdoba CF after rejecting a contract extension.

Juan Carlos appeared in 15 matches in his debut season, as the Andalusians returned to La Liga after a 42-year absence. He made his debut in the competition on 25 August 2014, starting in a 2–0 away defeat to Real Madrid.

Juan Carlos returned to his first club Rayo on 6 August 2015, after agreeing to a two-year deal. On 23 July of the following year, after suffering top-flight relegation, he signed a two-year contract with Elche CF.

On 28 June 2017, after another relegation, Juan Carlos signed a two-year deal at CD Lugo still in the second tier. On 20 January 2018, the day of his 30th birthday, he scored with a kick from his own half in the 3–1 home win over Sporting de Gijón.

On 25 June 2019, Juan Carlos signed a two-year contract with Girona FC, recently relegated to the second division.

Notes

References

External links

1988 births
Living people
People from Guadalajara, Spain
Sportspeople from the Province of Guadalajara
Spanish footballers
Footballers from Castilla–La Mancha
Association football goalkeepers
La Liga players
Segunda División players
Segunda División B players
Tercera División players
CD Guadalajara (Spain) footballers
Rayo Vallecano B players
Rayo Vallecano players
Hércules CF players
Córdoba CF players
Elche CF players
CD Lugo players
Girona FC players